Troelstralaan is a metro station in Schiedam, situated on Rotterdam Metro line C. The station was opened on 4 November 2002 as part of the last major expansion of the Rotterdam metro. The main entrance, at the east end of the subway station, is located on the street named after P.J. Troelstra, and the island platform is accessible by entrances on both ends.

Rotterdam Metro stations
Buildings and structures in Schiedam
Railway stations opened in 2002
2002 establishments in the Netherlands
Railway stations in the Netherlands opened in the 21st century